ANSI.SYS is a device driver in the DOS family of operating systems that provides extra console functions through ANSI escape sequences. It is partially based upon a subset of the text terminal control standard proposed by the ANSI X3L2 Technical Committee on Codes and Character Sets (the "X3 Committee").

As it was not installed by default, and was notoriously slow, little software took advantage of it and instead resorted to directly manipulating the IBM PC hardware.

Usage

DEVICE=drive:\path\ANSI.SYS options

where drive: and path are the drive letter and path to the directory in which the file  is found, and options can be a number of optional switches to control the behaviour.  may also be loaded into upper memory via /.

  use extended keyboard BIOS functions (INT 16h) rather than standard ones
  force number of lines
  adjust line scrolling to support screen readers
  or  set screensize
  support redefinition of extended key codes independent of standard codes

Functionality
Once loaded,  enables code sequences to apply various text formatting features. Using this driver, programs that write to the standard output can make use of the 16 text foreground colors and 8 background colors available in VGA-compatible text mode, make text blink, change the location of the cursor on the screen, and blank the screen. It also allows for the changing of the video mode from standard 80×25 text mode to a number of different graphics modes (for example, 320×200 graphics mode with text drawn as pixels, though ANSI.SYS does not provide calls to turn individual pixels on and off).

The standard  is relatively slow as it maps escape sequences to the equivalent BIOS calls. Several companies made third-party replacements that interface directly with the video memory, in a similar way to most DOS programs that have a full-screen user interface.

By default, the internal DOS command  works by directly calling the corresponding BIOS function to clear the screen, thereby prominently violating the hardware abstraction model otherwise maintained. However, if an ANSI driver is detected by the DR-DOS , it will instead send the control sequence defined in the reserved environment variable  to the attached console device. If the environment variable is undefined, it falls back to send the sequence  instead. Due to the difficulties to define environment variables containing binary data COMMAND.COM also accepts a special  notation for octal numbers.

SET $CLS=\033+

They are also supported by the command interpreters in Concurrent DOS, Multiuser DOS and REAL/32, although they use VT52 rather than ANSI control sequences by default (e.g. ).

Keyboard remapping
Using special escape sequences, the user can define any keystroke that has a character-code mapping to simulate an arbitrary sequence of such keystrokes. This feature was also used to create simple trojans out of text files laced with nefarious keyboard remaps, known as "ANSI bombs". A number of products were released to protect users against this:
 Some versions of ANSI.SYS support a command line switch to disable the key remapping feature, f.e. the option  (Secure) in ANSI.SYS of Datalight ROM-DOS or NANSI.SYS of FreeDOS. Other ANSI drivers like ANSIPLUS can be configured to disable the redefinition of keys as well.
 Setting CONFIG.SYS  in PTS-DOS provides a built-in ANSI driver not supporting the keyboard remapping functions.
 Some of the third-party ANSI.SYS replacements were deliberately designed never to support the keyboard remapping functions.
 PKWARE produced a terminate-and-stay-resident program, PKSFANSI (PK Safe ANSI), which filters out keyboard remapping escape codes as they are written to the standard output. This has the advantage that the user can load some useful remappings from a text file and then run PKSFANSI to prevent further, possibly malicious remappings.

Occurrence
 appeared in MS-DOS 2.0, the first version of the operating system supporting device drivers. It was supported by all following versions of MS-DOS. It is also present in many non-Microsoft DOS systems, e.g. IBM PC DOS and DR-DOS.

 was required to run some software that used its cursor and color control functions. It could also be used to enable elaborate color codes in the  prompt.

Most versions of Windows did not support ANSI escape codes in any useful way (it could be used by MSDOS emulation in some versions). In Windows 10 support for similar escape sequences was built into the Win32 console (the text terminal window), but must be activated using the Windows API function  by setting the  flag.

Features
CSI (Control Sequence Introducer) is a placeholder for the common two-byte escape lead-in sequence "" (that is). The ANSI standard also defines an alternative single-byte CSI code , which is not supported by ANSI.SYS.

Standard DOS  drivers support only the following sub-set of ANSI escape sequences:

They are not generally supported by ANSI consoles in other operating systems.

In some DOS implementations, video modes above 7 are not documented. Under Multiuser DOS, the only valid argument in conjunction with PCTERM is 7.

See also
 ANSI escape sequence

Notes

References

External links
 
 

DOS drivers
DOS files
DOS technology